Banksia Creek is the name of three watercourses in Australia:
 Banksia Creek (Queensland)
 Banksia Creek (Victoria)
 Banksia Creek (Western Australia)